Op Luang National Park is a national park in Chiang Mai Province, Thailand. It is home to a scenic river canyon, waterfalls, and caves.

Geography
The park's area is 345,625 rai ~ . It is contiguous with Doi Inthanon National Park. Like Doi Inthanon Park, Op Luang is in the Thanon Thong Chai Range.

History
Prehistoric paintings and other artefacts have been found in Op Luang National Park. The Doi Pha Chang area has a cliff painting of an elephant. Near Op Luang Canyon there are more rock paintings, as well as ancient jewelry and tools. Carbon-dating has indicated these relics to be about 28,000 years old.

The park was a forest park from 1966 to 1991. In 1991 Op Luang became Thailand's 68th National Park.

Attractions
The park's main attraction is Op Luang Canyon, carved out by the Mae Chaem River.

Thep Thanom is a hot spring in the west of the park.

Tham Tong is a granite and limestone cave leading to long tunnels. Tham Tu Pu cave features stalagmites and stalactites.

Flora and fauna
The park features forest types including mixed deciduous, deciduous dipterocarp and evergreen. Tree species include Hopea odorata, Dipterocarpus alatus, Xylia xylocarpa, teak, Afzelia xylocarpa, Toona ciliata, Diospyros mollis, Terminalia alata and Lagerstroemia as well as various bamboos, palms and ferns.

Animal species include tiger, sambar deer, Asiatic black bear, common palm civet, large-spotted civet, Sunda pangolin, Phayre's leaf monkey, Siamese hare, Southwest China serow (now mainland serow), tree monitor, northern treeshrew, northern red muntjac (Muntiacus muntjak vaginalis) and wild boar.

Avian life includes vernal hanging parrot, scarlet minivet, white-rumped shama, spotted dove, greater coucal, hill myna, Siamese fireback, red junglefowl, shikra, falconet, red-whiskered bulbul, woodpecker, pheasant and partridge.

See also
List of national parks of Thailand
List of Protected Areas Regional Offices of Thailand

References

National parks of Thailand
Geography of Chiang Mai province
Tourist attractions in Chiang Mai province
1991 establishments in Thailand
Protected areas established in 1991